Dubouzetia is a genus of about eleven species known to science, growing from shrubs up to large trees, in Papuasia and Australasia and constituting part of the plant family Elaeocarpaceae.

They grow naturally in New Caledonia, New Guinea, the Moluccas, and in Australia in the Northern Territory and north-eastern Queensland.

Some species grow from understorey trees up to large trees in the natural habitats of rainforests, some species grow up to smaller shrubs in drier forests and in Australia two rare species occur, only known from sandstone rocky outcrops.

In Australia, the very restricted north-eastern Queensland endemic species D. saxatilis has official recognition of its risk of extinction in the wild by the Queensland state government's official "vulnerable" species conservation status.

Naming and classification
In 1861 European science formally named and described this genus and its New Caledonia type species D. campanulata, authored by the French botanists Adolphe-Théodore Brongniart & Jean Antoine Arthur Gris.

Many species' formal names and descriptions were published since that time, together with a few revisions of the genus or parts of it.

Species
 Dubouzetia acuminata  – New Caledonia endemic
 Dubouzetia australiensis  – Northern Territory endemic, Australia
 Dubouzetia campanulata  – New Caledonia endemic
 Dubouzetia caudiculata  syn.: D. leionema  – New Caledonia endemic
 Dubouzetia confusa  – New Caledonia endemic
 Dubouzetia dentata  – Seram Island, Moluccas endemic
 Dubouzetia elegans  – New Guinea, New Caledonia
 var. elegans, syn.: D. parviflora  – New Caledonia endemic
 var. novoguineensis , syn.: D. novoguineensis  – New Guinea
 Dubouzetia galorei  – New Guinea endemic
 Dubouzetia guillauminii  – New Caledonia endemic
 Dubouzetia kairoi  – New Guinea endemic
 Dubouzetia saxatilis  - north-eastern Qld endemic, Australia

References

Elaeocarpaceae
Flora of New Caledonia
Flora of Papua New Guinea
Flora of the Northern Territory
Flora of Queensland
Flora of the Maluku Islands
Elaeocarpaceae genera
Taxa named by Adolphe-Théodore Brongniart
Taxa named by Jean Antoine Arthur Gris
Taxa named by Jean Armand Isidore Pancher